Hana Mandlíková and Pam Shriver won in the final 6–3, 6–7, 6–3 against Rosalyn Fairbank and Gretchen Magers.

Seeds
Champion seeds are indicated in bold text while text in italics indicates the round in which those seeds were eliminated.

 Jana Novotná /  Helena Suková (semifinals)
 Lori McNeil /  Eva Pfaff (first round)
 Isabelle Demongeot /  Nathalie Tauziat (semifinals)
 Jenny Byrne /  Robin White (first round)

Draw

References
 1989 Virginia Slims of Indian Wells Women's Doubles Draw

Virginia Slims of Indian Wells Doubles